Martina Hingis was the defending champion, but lost to  Elena Dementieva in the quarterfinals.

Jelena Dokić won the title, defeating Dementieva in the final 6–3, 6–3.

Seeds
The top four seeds received a bye to the second round.

  Martina Hingis (quarterfinals)
  Amélie Mauresmo (second round)
  Justine Henin (second round)
  Nathalie Tauziat (second round)
  Jelena Dokić (champion)
  Silvia Farina Elia (semifinals)
  Magdalena Maleeva (second round)
  Elena Dementieva (final)

Draw

Finals

Top half

Bottom half

External links
 Kremlin Cup draw

Kremlin Cup
Kremlin Cup